Kellyville is a town in Creek County, Oklahoma, United States. The population was 1,150 at the 2010 census, compared to 906 in 2000.

History
Kellyville was named for James E. Kelly , who established a local trading post in 1892 and opened a post office on November 27, 1893.  St. Louis and Oklahoma City Railroad (later merged into the St. Louis and San Francisco Railway) built a line through Kellyville in 1898.

Oklahoma's worst train disaster took place just west of Kellyville on September 28, 1917, when two Frisco trains collided. Twenty-three people were killed and eighty injured. It remains one of the country's bloodiest train wrecks due to the large number of cattle deaths. In the early 1970s, there were plans to build a ski resort in Kellyville — Oklahoma's first — using artificial snow, but the idea was short-lived due to the region's climate.

Oil and gas were discovered nearby in 1915. This created a population boom and attracted construction of a refinery in Kellyville. By 1930, the population was 548. Although oil and gas production waned, population continued to grow. Now, a significant number of employed residents commute to jobs in Sapulpa and Tulsa.  However, Webco Industries has become a major local employer, having opened a corrosion-resistant alloy plant in Kellyville in 2008 which produces specialty nickel alloy and stainless tubing.  The plant was significantly expanded in 2018.

Geography
Kellyville is located in northeastern Creek County at  (35.942771, -96.219497).

Demographics

At the 2000 census, there were 906 people, 349 households and 258 families residing in the town. There were 413 housing units at an average density of 476.4 per square mile (183.3/km2). The racial makeup of the town was 83.55% White, 0.66% African American, 10.15% Native American, 0.11% Pacific Islander, 0.55% from other races, and 4.97% from two or more races. Hispanic or Latino of any race were 1.32% of the population.

There were 349 households, of which 33.5% had children under the age of 18 living with them, 53.3% were married couples living together, 14.9% had a female householder with no husband present, and 25.8% were non-families. 23.5% of all households were made up of individuals, and 11.2% had someone living alone who was 65 years of age or older. The average household size was 2.60 and the average family size was 3.03.

26.4% of the population were under the age of 18, 10.5% from 18 to 24, 27.7% from 25 to 44, 22.5% from 45 to 64, and 12.9% who were 65 years of age or older. The median age was 35 years. For every 100 females, there were 91.1 males. For every 100 females age 18 and over, there were 87.9 males.

 The median household income was $30,688 and the median family income was $32,297. Males had a median income of $27,639 and females $18,229. The per capita income was $11,978. About 9.2% of families and 12.3% of the population were below the poverty line, including 19.8% of those under age 18 and 8.1% of those age 65 or over.

Parks and recreation
Heyburn Lake and Heyburn State Park are about a -mile drive to the west of Kellyville.  RV and tent camping is available, and the lake features picnic areas, a playground, a boat launch, swimming and fishing. 

The Creek County Fairgrounds in Kellyville is the location for various local, county, state, and national events, including fairs, livestock shows & rodeos, trade shows, family reunions, conferences, banquets, and educational programs.

The Kellyville Public Park has playground equipment, a pavilion, and picnic tables.

References

Towns in Creek County, Oklahoma
Towns in Oklahoma
Tulsa metropolitan area